Tank and the Bangas is an American musical group based in New Orleans, Louisiana. The band won the 2017 NPR Tiny Desk Contest and in November 2019, they were nominated in the Best New Artist category for the 2020 Grammy Awards. They have released three studio albums, Thinktank (2013), Green Balloon (2019), and Red Balloon (2022).

History
Members of Tank and the Bangas met at a New Orleans open mic show called Liberation Lounge at now-closed Blackstar Cafe and Books in the Algiers section of New Orleans and formed the group in 2011.

Style
Writing in The Washingtonian, Heather Rudow described the group's work as "lively fusion of funk, soul, hip hop, rock, and spoken word." Speaking to the Times-Picayune, the musicians in the group mentioned a variety of genres they identify with, including rock, folk, gospel and Anjelika "Jelly" Joseph's invention "Soulful Disney". In addition to Disney, the group has also mentioned anime as influence on the group's "childlike" and "magical" sensibility, in Ball's words. In the Financial Times, Joshua David Stein said, "Tank and the Bangas don’t conform to the jazz stereotypes trotted out in the lobbies of convention hotels or milked on Frenchman Street. It’s New Orleans but it’s New Orleans now."

Reception
In The Village Voice, Rajul Punjabi described the group's debut album ThinkTank as "sincere and eclectic. Ball’s vocals are strong and versatile—evidence of her childhood in church—and she coasts through sweet melodies and wide-ranging vocal undulations reminiscent of Nicki Minaj’s character voices. She throws gentle shade when reminded of this — 'I’ve been doing that before she came out,' she says."

NPR
Naming Tank and the Bangas the 2017 winner of NPR's Tiny Desk Contest for their song "Quick", NPR co-host of All Songs Considered Bob Boilen, "What won me over about the band's performance of 'Quick' were the interactions among lead singer Tarriona 'Tank' Ball and her bandmates, and the way they seemed to surprise one another. It all felt so organic and on-the-spot." Juror Trey Anastasio of Phish said, "I immediately loved this...Tank is a force of nature, just full of joy—and her band is killing in the background." The story of the evolution of Tank's voice was covered in an episode of NPR's World Cafe show for essential and emerging artists.

Members

Current members
Tarriona "Tank" Ball – lead vocals (2011–present)
Joshua Johnson – drums, musical director (2011–present)
Norman Spence II – bass, keyboards, guitar (2011–present)
Albert Allenback – alto saxophone, flute (2016–present)

Touring members
Performers that while not core members of the band, play with the band at live performances and on some album tracks.
Anjelika "Jelly" Joseph – background vocals (2013–present)
Danny Abel – guitar (2018)
Jonathan Johnson – bass (2017–present)
Etienne Stoufflet – tenor saxophone (2019-present)
Kayla Jasmine – vocals (2016–2019)

Past members	
Merell Burkett, Jr. – keyboard (2013–2020)
Joe Johnson – keyboard (2013–2016)
Keenan McRae – guitar (2013)
Nita Bailey – percussion (2013)
Christopher Menge – guitar (2013)
Nicole Spence – background vocals (2013)

Discography

Studio albums

Live albums

Extended plays

Singles

As lead artist

As featured artist

Music videos

Notes

Honors
 2014 RAWards Best New Orleans Artist of the Year
 2014 Offbeat Magazine Emerging Artist Award
 2016 Afropunk Festival contest winners
 2017 NPR Tiny Desk Contest winner
2020 Grammy Award for Best New Artist (nomination)
2023 Grammy Award for Best Progressive R&B Album (nomination for Red Balloon)

References

External links

 Official Tank and the Bangas website
 Tank and the Bangas perform at the Kennedy Center, January 13, 2016

Musical groups established in 2011
2011 establishments in Louisiana
Musical groups from New Orleans
American funk musical groups
American soul musical groups
American hip hop groups
Rock music groups from Louisiana
Spoken word artists
Verve Forecast Records artists